These are the Australian Country number-one albums of 2013, per the ARIA Charts.

See also
2013 in music
List of number-one albums of 2013 (Australia)

References

2013
Australia country albums
Number-one country albums